Susuz can refer to the following places in Turkey:

 Susuz, a town in Kars Province
 Susuz, Afyonkarahisar, a town in Afyonkarahisar Province
 Susuz, Araç, a village in Kastamonu Province
 Susuz, Atkaracalar, a village in Çankırı Province
 Susuz, Bucak, a village in Burdur Province
 Susuz, Çubuk, a neighbourhood in Ankara Province
 Susuz, Göynük, a village in Bolu Province
 Susuz, Kahta, a village in Adıyaman Province
 Susuz, Sandıklı, a village in Afyonkarahisar Province
 Susuz, Şavşat, a village in Artvin Province
 Susuz, Seben, a village in Bolu Province
 Susuz, Şenkaya, a neighbourhood in Erzurum Province
 Susuz, Silvan, a neighbourhood in Diyarbakır Province
 Susuz, Vezirköprü, a village in Samsun Province